Lady Harriet Acland (née Fox-Strangways; 3 January 175021 July 1815) was a British noblewoman and diarist. She accompanied her husband to British North America and became celebrated for her personal courage. She is commemorated on one of the bronze reliefs on second floor of the Saratoga Monument in the State of New York.

Early life 
She began life as The Honourable Christian Henrietta Caroline "Harriet" Fox-Strangways, daughter of Stephen Fox-Strangways (then Baron Ilchester), and his wife, the former Elizabeth Horner. When her father was raised to his earldom, Harriet became "Lady Harriet Fox-Strangways".

Marriage and issue 
In 1770, at the age of twenty, she married John Dyke Acland, son of Sir Thomas Dyke Acland, 7th Baronet, and his wife, Elizabeth Dyke. Lady Harriet and her husband had two children:

 Elizabeth "Kitty" Acland (13 December 1772 – 5 March 1813); married Henry Herbert, 2nd Earl of Carnarvon.
 Sir John Dyke Acland, 8th Baronet (1778–1785); inherited the baronetcy at the age of 7 on the death of his paternal grandfather, the 7th Baronet. Sir John died a few weeks later, aged 7, and the baronetcy passed to his uncle Sir Thomas Dyke Acland, 9th Baronet.

American Revolution 
Lady Harriet travelled with her husband to the Province of Quebec and the Thirteen Colonies when he commanded the 20th Regiment of Foot. At the time of the Battles of Saratoga, during the American Revolutionary War, Lady Harriet heard that her husband had been wounded and travelled through the rebel lines to find him. Her husband, who had been shot through both legs, improved with her careful nursing. The next year they returned to England, where Colonel Acland died at Pixton Park, Dulverton near Exmoor on 31 October 1778.

Widowhood and death 
During the long period of her widowhood, 1778-1815, Lady Harriet remained at Pixton Park, building the lane now known as Lady Harriet Acland's Drive to connect to where her daughter, Elizabeth, the Countess of Carnarvon, lived near Wiveliscombe.

Lady Harriet died, aged 65, at Tetton, near Taunton.

American War of Independence

A 1784 engraving by Robert Pollard depicting Lady Harriet Acland on the Hudson River is inscribed as follows:
This amiable Lady accompanied her Husband to Canada in the Year 1776, & during two Campaigns, under went such fatigue & distress as female fortitude was thought incapable of supporting; and once She narrowly escaped with life from her Tent which was set on fire in the Night. The Event here commemorated deserves to be recorded in History. In the unfortunate Action between G. Burgoyne & G. Gates Oct,, 7, 1777, Major Ackland was wounded & made Prisoner, when his Lady received the news She formed the heroic Resolution of delivering herself into the hands of the Enemy that she might attend him during the Captivity For this purpose, with a Letter from G. Burgoyne to G. Gates, accompanied by the Rev. Mr. Brudinell who carried a Flag of Truce, one female servant, & her husbands Valet, she rowed down Hudsons River in an open boat towards the America Camp, but Night coming on before she reached their outposts the Guards on duty refused to receive her & threatened to fire upon her if she moved till morning In this dreadful situation for 7 or 8 dark & cold hours, she was compelled to wait on the Water half dead with anxiety & terror. The morning put an end to her distress, she was receiv'd by Gen. Gates & restored to her husband with that politeness & humanity her sex, quality, & Virtue so justly merited. / See G. Burgoynes Narrative'.

References

Additional sources 
 Acland, Lady Harriet. The Acland Journal: Lady Harriet Acland and the American Revolution. Winchester, England: Hampshire County Council, 1993.
 Young Folks Cyclopedia, 1882
 
 
 
 

1750 births
1815 deaths
18th-century British people
19th-century British people
18th-century British women
19th-century British women
English nurses
Female wartime nurses
People from Taunton
Daughters of British earls
Harriet
Place of birth missing
American Revolutionary War nurses
Harriet
British diarists